Chinese customs may refer to:

 The agencies taxed with collecting tariffs and other fees on goods imported to or exported from China, particularly:
General Administration of Customs
Chinese Maritime Customs Service
Chinese customs gold unit
 The agency responsible for controlling its borders
 China Immigration Inspection
 Various features of Chinese culture, including:
Chinese pre-wedding customs